Nib-Lit is a weekly comics journal edited by Mykl Sivak and published both independently in an electronic format as well as running as a two-page section in Southern News, the student newspaper of Southern Connecticut State University. The journal features original and syndicated strips by a wide range of international cartoonists, both established and up-and-coming. It features a number of comics formats from single panel comic strips, to multi-page graphic short stories, to serialized graphic novels. The journal also prints comics related columns and criticism by writers from within and outside of the comics world. Nib-Lit also regularly releases a podcast featuring interviews with creators from across the comics world.

Nib-Lit sponsors and organizes the New Haven Summer Comics Fest. The Fest is a one-day event featuring artist and publisher tables; panel discussions; short films and animations directed by and/or featuring work of comics creators; comics slide shows; and a keg of free beer. The event exists in conjunction with the New Haven Street Fest, a yearly event coordinated by the not-for-profit group Ideat Village.

Formats
Nib-Lit is released weekly as a full-color digital download.
During the fall and spring semesters, it is printed as a two-page spread in the Southern News. Each page measures 22.75 x 12.75 inches. While most newspaper comics sections reduce the size of strips and panels, Nib-Lit publishes comics 11.25 inches wide, a single comic spanning the entire width of the paper.

As well as weekly issues, Nib-Lit frequently releases special download only editions including Complete Volume anthologies and Artist vs. Artist expanded-page editions.

Contributors
Notable contributors include:
 Tony Millionaire, creator of the comic strip Maakies and the comic book Sock Monkey.
 Shannon Wheeler, creator of the comic strip Too Much Coffee Man.
 Howard Cruse, creator of Wendel and Gay Comix.
 Nick Abadzis, creator of the graphic novel Laika.
 Sean Pryor, illustrator for Smith Magazine's Harvey Pekar Project.
 Sam Henderson, cartoonist, writer and expert on American comedy history.
 Steve Skeates, writer for DC Comics and Marvel Comics.
 Kristyna Baczynski, cartoonist and animator for BBC, Maker's Mark Whiskey, and more.
 Josh Bayer & Jouquin de la Puente, creators of Bam-Bam and the Barbarians.
 Marc Palm, a.k.a. Swellzombie, VHS historian and creator of Swellzomies lair of the Psychic Creature.
 Box Brown, creator of Bellen!.
 Nicolas Chalupa Chanic, editor of Lazer Art Zine, Belgian arts journal.
 Jarod Rosello
 Craig Collins, Iain Laurie, Dave Alexander
 Mike Wood, author of Alchemy.

Podcast 
Podcast interviews include:
 Shannon Wheeler
 Howard Cruse
 Mike Dawson
 Liz Baille
 Bill Plympton
 Gabrielle Bell
 Abby Denson
 Matt Loux

References

External links 
 
 WNPR, The Colin McEnroe Show: Micro-lit 
 Your Public Media, The Colin McEnroe Show: Micro-lit 

Magazines about comics
Magazines published in Connecticut
Weekly magazines published in the United States
Downloadable magazines
Magazines with year of establishment missing